For Those Who Think Young may refer to:
For Those Who Think Young (film), a 1964 beach party film for which Pepsi was the sponsor
For Those Who Think Young (album), 1981 album by Rough Trade
"For Those Who Think Young" (Mad Men)

See also
"Now It's Pepsi for Those Who Think Young", an advertising slogan used by Pepsi from 1961 through 1964